The Fur Collar is a 1962 British thriller film directed by Lawrence Huntington and starring John Bentley, Martin Benson and Philip Friend.

Plot
A man wearing a fur-collared coat is shot on his arrival in Paris. A British journalist is convinced that he was intended victim, as he also wears a fur-collar, and his made dangerous enemies by an Exposé.

Cast

 John Bentley as Mike Andrews 
 Martin Benson as Martin Benson 
 Philip Friend as Eddie Morgan 
 Nadja Regin as Marie Lejeune 
 Balbina as Jacqueline Legrain 
 Hector Ross as Roger Harding 
 Gordon Sterne as Duclos 
 Guy Middleton as Resident 
 Brian Nissen as Carl Jorgensen
 John Gabriel as Hotel Receptionist
 Tommy Duggan as Foreign Agent
 Murray Kash as Jules
 Eddie Mulloy as Donten 
 Clarissa Stolz as Chambermaid

References

External links

1962 films
1960s thriller films
British thriller films
Films directed by Lawrence Huntington
1960s English-language films
1960s British films